Doppelgänger Week was an internet meme in February 2010 in which Facebook users of social networking websites changed their profile picture to that of celebrities, athletes, historical figures, or friends with whom they share a physical resemblance.

In a Huffington Post piece, it was claimed to be started by Bob Patel, who was constantly told by workmates that he looks like Tom Selleck. However, news organisations including ABC cast doubt on the verifiability of the interview later.

See also
 Doppelgänger

References

Internet memes
Computer-related introductions in 2010